Morpheis impedita is a moth in the family Cossidae. It was described by Wallengren in 1860. It is found in South America.

References

Natural History Museum Lepidoptera generic names catalog

Zeuzerinae
Moths described in 1860